Garnet Gordon Goodrick (19 February 1895 – 26 January 1929) was an Australian sportsman who played first-class cricket for Tasmania and Australian rules football with Carlton in the Victorian Football League (VFL).

Goodrick was born in Tasmania and played his early football at North Hobart and New Town before being recruited by Carlton. He made 21 appearances and kicked five goals for Carlton, over the 1923, 1924 and 1925 VFL seasons. After leaving Carlton he joined the Northcote Football Club.  

His only first-class cricket match came in February 1923, before he joined Carlton and took place at the Melbourne Cricket Ground. Playing against Victoria, Goodrick batted in the middle order and made scores of one and 20 in his two innings. He then conceded 114 runs from his 22 overs as Victoria amassed a record first-class score of 1059 all out, 429 of which came from Bill Ponsford.

See also
 List of Tasmanian representative cricketers

References

External links

Cricinfo: Garnet Goodrick

1895 births
1929 deaths
Australian cricketers
Tasmania cricketers
Australian rules footballers from Tasmania
Carlton Football Club players
Glenorchy Football Club players
Glenorchy Football Club coaches
North Hobart Football Club players
Northcote Football Club players
Cricketers from Tasmania